Isaac Lindley (1904–1989) was a Peruvian businessman. He is the son of the founders of the soft drink Inca Kola.

External links
Inka Cola Official Website US
Inka Cola Official Website Peru

20th-century Peruvian businesspeople
People from Lima
1904 births
1989 deaths